Steffi Graf was the defending champion going into the final against her rival Gabriela Sabatini. Just the previous month, Sabatini defeated Steffi Graf 3–6, 6–3, 7–5 in the final at Amelia Island, Florida. Now, in her native Germany, Steffi would turn the tables against Sabatini, beating her 6–3, 6–1. Prior to this match, Sabatini had played in four finals in 1989, with her winning twice. For Steffi, this victory was her seventh of the year, and marked the sixteenth time out of nineteen matches she had beaten Sabatini.

Seeds
A champion seed is indicated in bold text while text in italics indicates the round in which that seed was eliminated. The top eight seeds received a bye to the second round.

  Steffi Graf (champion)
  Sabatini (final)
  Helena Suková (third round)
  Katerina Maleeva (third round)
  Mary Joe Fernández (third round)
  Helen Kelesi (semifinals)
  Sandra Cecchini (quarterfinals)
  Sylvia Hanika (quarterfinals)
  Radka Zrubáková (third round)
  Barbara Paulus (quarterfinals)
  Bettina Fulco (second round)
  Nathalie Tauziat (third round)
  Terry Phelps (first round)
  Nicole Provis (first round)
  Isabelle Demongeot (first round)
  Gretchen Magers (first round)

Draw

Finals

Top half

Section 1

Section 2

Bottom half

Section 3

Section 4

References
 1989 Lufthansa Cup Draw

WTA German Open
1989 WTA Tour